The Burrell Heights Apartments is a building complex in southeast Portland, Oregon listed on the National Register of Historic Places.

Further reading

See also
 National Register of Historic Places listings in Southeast Portland, Oregon

References

External links
 

1928 establishments in Oregon
Residential buildings completed in 1928
Apartment buildings on the National Register of Historic Places in Portland, Oregon
Richmond, Portland, Oregon